The Universidad Autónoma Latinoamericana (UNAULA) is a Colombian private university, located in the center of Medellín, Antioquia, founded in 1966 by dissident students and professors from the Universidad of Medellín.

References

Universities and colleges in Colombia